Albert Campbell "Cam" Burgess (21 September 1919 – September 1978) was an English footballer who played as a forward. He played in the Football League for four clubs.

Playing career
Burgess was born in Bebington, Cheshire. He began playing with non-league club Bromborough before joining Bolton Wanderers in February 1938, with his Football League First Division debut finally arriving against Brentford in May 1947. In October 1948 he moved to Chester, where he scored 64 league goals over the next three years to currently place him as the club's sixth highest Football League goalscorer.

Burgess was top scorer in two successive seasons with Crystal Palace before finishing his league career at York City. He then returned to non-league football with Runcorn and lived in Birkenhead until he died in September 1978.

External links

References

1919 births
1978 deaths
People from Bebington
Sportspeople from Birkenhead
English footballers
Association football forwards
Bolton Wanderers F.C. players
Chester City F.C. players
Crystal Palace F.C. players
York City F.C. players
Runcorn F.C. Halton players
English Football League players